Massimo Paci (born 9 May 1978) is an Italian football coach and a former player. He was most recently the manager of Pro Vercelli.

Biography
Paci started his career at Ancona. He made his Serie A debut for Lecce on 18 September 2004 against Brescia. In July 2005, he was signed by Genoa, but after Genoa Serie A place was canceled due to match-fixing, he was loaned to Ascoli which replace Genoa in Serie A.

Paci moved to Parma in 2006 for €1.8 million in a 4-year contract. He made 124 appearances in 5 years before his 2011 departure  to Novara for free. On 20 July 2012 he was signed by A.C. Siena, with Lorenzo Del Prete moved to opposite direction.

On 4 July 2014 Paci was signed by Serie B club Brescia in a 1-year contract.

On 28 July 2014 he was signed by Lega Pro club Pisa.

Coaching career
After retiring, he became a part of Marco Schenardi's coaching staff at Civitanovese. In September 2015, he then moved to The United States to participate in master courses reserved for coaches. He returned to Italy in 2016 and became manager of Civitanovese on 8 February 2016. He was in charge until the end of the season.

In July 2017, he became manager of Montegiorgio Calcio. He left the club on 8 May 2019. Paci was later announced as manager of Forlì FC for the 2019/20 season.

On 21 August 2020 he was hired by Serie C club Teramo. After guiding Teramo to the promotion playoff, which ended in a first round loss to Palermo, he was hired by Serie B club Pordenone on a two-year deal. He was dismissed on 30 August 2021 following three defeats in the first three official games of the season.

On 1 July 2022, Paci was announced as the new head coach of Serie C club Pro Vercelli. He was dismissed on 20 February 2023 together with his assistant Roberto Guana.

Career statistics

Managerial statistics

Honours
Serie B Runner-up: 2009
Serie C1 Promotion Playoffs Winner:  2000

References

External links
 

1978 births
Living people
Sportspeople from the Province of Fermo
Italian footballers
A.C. Ancona players
U.S. Lecce players
Parma Calcio 1913 players
Ascoli Calcio 1898 F.C. players
Ternana Calcio players
Juventus F.C. players
Novara F.C. players
A.C.N. Siena 1904 players
Brescia Calcio players
Pisa S.C. players
Serie A players
Serie B players
Serie C players
Association football defenders
Italian football managers
Serie C managers
Serie B managers
F.C. Pro Vercelli 1892 managers
Footballers from Marche